Raiders of Sunset Pass is a 1943 American Western film directed by John English with a screenplay by John K. Butler.

Plot
The film is set in Texas during World War II when most of the able-bodied men of military age are away fighting for the United States. A gang of cattle rustlers, led by Henry Judson and Lefty Lewis, decide to take advantage of the situation by stealing from rancher Dad Mathews and other cattle farmers. Texas Ranger Johnny Revere and his sidekick Frog Millhouse arrive to handel the situation. With some help from Mathews' daughter, Betty, they manage to win in the end.

Cast
Eddie Dew as Johnny Revere
Smiley Burnette as Frog Millhouse
Jennifer Holt as Betty Mathews
LeRoy Mason as Henry Judson
Roy Barcroft as Lefty Lewis
Charles F. Miller as Rancher Mathews
Maxine Doyle as Sally Meehan

External links

1943 films
1943 Western (genre) films
Republic Pictures films
American Western (genre) films
Films directed by John English
American black-and-white films
1940s American films